Fando y Lis is a 1968 Mexican film directed by Alejandro Jodorowsky in his feature length directorial debut. It is an adaptation of a 1962 play of the same name by Fernando Arrabal, who was working with Jodorowsky on performance art at the time. The film was shot in high-contrast black-and-white on the weekends with a small budget and was first shown at the Acapulco Film Festival in 1968. Fando y Lis stars Sergio Kleiner and Diana Mariscal as the titular pair who embark on a surreal quest in search of Tar, a mythical heaven-like place.

Plot
The film follows Fando (Sergio Klainer) and his paraplegic girlfriend Lis (Diana Mariscal) through a barren, postapocalyptic wasteland in search of the mythical city of Tar, a place where one will know the true nature of eternity, and reach enlightenment. On their journey they see many odd and profoundly disturbing characters and events.

The narrative of the film leaves a lot to the audience's interpretation, as the avant-garde and surreal nature in which the events of the film are presented mimic the workings of the subconscious.

Cast
 Sergio Klainer as Fando
 Diana Mariscal as Lis
 Juan José Arreola as Well-Dressed Man with Book
 Alejandro Jodorowsky as Puppeteer

Release
Fando y Lis premiered at the 1968 Acapulco Film Festival. A full-scale riot subsequently broke out, leading to the film being banned in Mexico. Fando y Lis was shown in New York's 5th Avenue Cinema where it was dubbed, re-edited and cut by 13 minutes. It was shown in London in February 1971, re-titled as Tar Babies, running 98 minutes. It was not released in Mexico until July 1972. 

Fando y Lis received a 4K digital restoration by  ABKCO in 2020. ABKCO partnered with  Alamo Drafthouse to release it on their streaming platform that year and released the film on Blu-ray and DVD in 2021.

Reception
Fando y Lis was released in New York City to generally negative reviews, with many critics comparing it unfavorably to Fellini Satyricon, which had recently opened. It was also criticized for its shock value, while acknowledging its role it surrealist media.

References

Bibliography

External links
 
 

1968 films
1960s avant-garde and experimental films
Art works that caused riots
Films about paraplegics or quadriplegics
Films directed by Alejandro Jodorowsky
Mexican black-and-white films
Mexican films based on plays
1960s Spanish-language films
Surrealist films
1968 directorial debut films
Film controversies
1960s Mexican films